Richmond Football Club is a rugby union club from Richmond, London. It is a founding member of the Rugby Football Union, and is one of the oldest football clubs (of any code). It fields teams in both men's and women's rugby; the men's first team currently play in the RFU Championship following their promotion from National League 1 at the end of the 2019–20 season, while the women's first team play in the Women's Championship.

History
Formed in 1861, it is one of the oldest football clubs in the world and holds a significant place in the history of association football, playing in the first ever match under the rules of the Football Association on 19 December 1863, against the Barnes Club, even though it was not a member of the Football Association. In 1878 it hosted the first ever floodlit match and in 1909 played in the inaugural match at Twickenham Stadium, the home of English rugby.

Richmond always traditionally played without a number 13 (similar to Bath) – the outside centre would wear 14, right wing 15 and fullback 16. However, during the professional era they adopted squad numbering; meaning rather than rugby's usual method of giving numbers 1–15 to the starting line-up, players were assigned a number for the season, as seen in football. Back in the amateur leagues, Richmond returned to their traditional numbering system before promotion to the National Leagues in 2008 saw them forced to adopt the uniform 1–15 numbering system according to RFU laws.

Professional era
In 1996, the then third division club was bought by financial markets trader and Monaco tax exile Ashley Levett. Levett turned the club into the first professional team in England, and began buying in big names to push the club up the leagues, including Ben Clarke from Bath, the first £1million signing. The club outgrew the Richmond Athletic Ground and became tenants at the Madejski Stadium in Reading. But the crowds and revenues from competition meant that Levett was continually financing the club, and so he placed it in administration in March 1999.

The professional Richmond club and professional London Scottish F.C. were both merged into London Irish, who moved to the Stoop Memorial Ground before taking up tenancy at Madejski the following year. This period of hesitancy and uncertainty resulted in many of the professional players leaving the club pre-merger, and returning to their original home-teams. The amateur club was reformed in 2000, and the club rejoined the leagues as an amateur club at the bottom of the pyramid.

Post administration
After the professional era, hooker Andy Cuthbert remained at the club and captained the side for several years.  Despite its lowly league position, Richmond has still managed to attract some top class players - former South Africa captain Bobby Skinstad joined for the 2005–06 season, Chilean fly-half Sebastian Berti joined in 2006 and England Students' wing Joe Ajuwa was a regular starter in the 1st XV.  Under head coach Andy Maren the club climbed through the lower ranks of the England rugby divisions, from Herts & Middlesex 1 (ninth level) to London 1 (fifth level) in four years, amassing a perfect record of 83 straight wins in league play in the process.  However, the club seemingly stalled at that level, continuing to put together winning seasons, but failing to gain promotion in 2005–06 and 2006–07.

In the 2007–08 season, Richmond laid out a serious plan for promotion - something they had failed to achieve in the past two seasons, one reason being they had not had any semi-professional players on their books.  For the 2007–08 season, the club recruited a number of semi-professional players to boost Richmond's promotion chances. One of these players was USA international Jon Hartman. Richmond eventually achieved promotion, winning all but one of their League games. 
The coach, Brett Taylor, laid out plans for the club to be in National League 2 South in two seasons, and attempts were made to structure the colts teams into an effective feeder system for the 1st XV. However, during summer 2008, London Scottish were boosted financially and subsequently signed Taylor as their head coach. 
Richmond appointed Geoff Richards to take his place. Following two years in National League Two, Geoff Richards decided not to renew his contract citing differences in opinion between the board and himself on how the club should move forward.  
In 2009–10 Richmond appointed Oxford University Director of Rugby Steve Hill to take over after fourteen years in charge of the university side. Within two years (summer 2011) promotion was achieved and Richmond played in National League 1 until the end of the 2015–16 season when they achieved a further promotion into the Green King IPA Championship. Following three seasons in the Championship, Richmond were relegated at the end of the 2018–19 season and forced to return to National League 1. They hit back strongly in season 2019–20, winning 20 out of 25 matches in National League 1 to finish top of the league and earn promotion back to the Championship.

Current standings

Youth
Richmond's youth section is also highly successful - London Irish fullback Delon Armitage was a member of the mini section, and London Wasps' centre Dominic Waldouck earned an England callup for the 2008 tour of New Zealand, having progressed through the agegroups at Richmond. London Wasps No.8 Hugo Ellis, another product of Richmond's youth section, captained Wales U16s, as well as England at U19 and was the England U20 Captain in the 2008 Grand Slam winning side, also reaching the finals of the iRB Junior World Championship. Yet another former Richmond Youth, Joe Simpson, winning his first full England cap in 2011 Rugby World Cup, also of London Wasps, was scrum half for the U20s. Simpson was in the England Sevens squad for the first round of the 2007–08 IRB Sevens World Series; Sevens being an important stepping stone for the development of the best youth talent.

In the 2009–10 season a colts team was revived based on the highly rated U17 age group team of the previous season, and several U19 players returning to further bolster the squad. They entered the National Colts Cup and having defeated eight opponents most notably Blackheath, they beat former champions Old Northamptonians, 25–12 at Franklin's Gardens.

Home ground
Richmond play at the Athletic Ground, Richmond, which borders Royal Mid Surrey Golf Club, and is close to other sporting facilities such as Richmond Swimming Pool, Old Deer Park and also a gym. The complex includes two pitches (pitches 3 & 4) by the front gate, the 1st team pitch and perpendicular to that, pitch 2. The site also has a disused driving range behind the 1st team pitch which has three pitches on it, and a disused bowls club. One side of the pitch has a large concrete all-seater stand, under which are the changing rooms, a canteen, shop, physio room and two bars. Also on this southern side of the pitch is a disused cricket pavilion which also contains several more changing rooms and showers. During the early professional years, a temporary stand was erected along the north side of the pitch.

Later on in the professional era, Richmond 1st team moved to the Madejski Stadium, Reading, where they played until bankruptcy. The stadium would later become London Irish's home ground, and was an early example of London rugby clubs playing in football grounds – London Wasps played at Loftus Road before moving to Adams Park, and Saracens moved to Vicarage Road.

Rivalries
Richmond contested the first ever rugby match with Blackheath F.C., and the clubs have continued to play an annual fixture to uphold the tradition – now referred to as the longest-running annual fixture in rugby. As of 2013–14, the two clubs are in the same league, after many years apart, meaning that they play each other at least twice during the regular season, in addition to the traditional pre-season fixture.

Richmond shared the Athletic Ground with London Scottish, and this rivalry is very intense. Both sides experienced a high point at the beginning of the professional era and played in the Premiership. Both teams also fell into administration and dropped down to a level well below the national leagues, and though the routes taken have been slightly different, both clubs have battled their way up the leagues. As of 2019–20, London Scottish were also in the Championship. In years when the clubs are in the same division, the two "home" and "away" matches are two of the most well-attended and hotly contested of the year.

Richmond also have a local rivalry with Barnes who they have recently frequently played as both sides sought to move into the national leagues.

At youth level, Richmond's strongest rivalry tends to be with nearby Rosslyn Park.  A Richmond vs Rosslyn Park game is always surrounded by controversy of some sort.

Honours 
Middlesex Sevens titles: (9) 
1951, 1953, 1955, 1974, 1975, 1977, 1979, 1980, 1983 
National League 1 champions: (3)
1991–92, 2015-16, 2019-20
Courage League National Division Two champions: 
1996–97
Herts/Middlesex 1 champions:
2000–01
Surrey Cup titles: (6)
2001, 2002, 2003, 2004, 2006, 2007
London Division 4 South West champions:
2001–02
London Division 3 South West champions:
2002–03
London Division 2 South champions:
2003–04
London Division 1 champions:
2007–08
'National League 2 (north v south) promotion play-off winners:
2011–12
 Gala Sevens
 Champions (1): 1984

Current squad

The Richmond squad for the 2022–23 season are:

Notable former playersSee also :Category:Richmond F.C. players''
  - Frank Reginald Adams
  - Harry Alexander
  - Allan Bateman
  - Tommy Bedford
  - Norman Biggs
  - Spencer Brown
  - Tony Bucknall
  - Daniel Carpo
  - Ernest Cheston
  - Ben Clarke
  - Thomas Crean
  - Arthur "Monkey" Gould
  - Bob Gould
  - Charles Gurdon
  - Edward Temple Gurdon
  - Ben Harvey
  - Jeremy Janion
  - Peter Kininmonth
  - Henry Arnold Lawrence
  - Dan Luger
  - Rolando Martín
  - Brian Moore
  - Boyd Morrison
  - Richard Parker
  - Agustín Pichot
  - Nick Preston
  - Craig Quinnell
  - Scott Quinnell
  - Chris Ralston
  - Alan Rotherham (IRB Hall of Fame inductee) 
  - Bobby Skinstad
  - Dyne Fenton Smith, also part of the first official British Isles team that toured South Africa in 1910
  - Dawson Turner - the only man to play in the first five rugby internationals
  - Earl Va'a
  - Barry Williams
 - Jeff Probyn

See also
 Rugby union in London
 Stefan Czerpak

References

External links
 Official site

Premiership Rugby teams
English rugby union teams
Rugby union clubs in London
Rugby clubs established in 1861
1861 establishments in England
1861 in English sport
Sport in the London Borough of Richmond upon Thames
Richmond, London
History of the London Borough of Richmond upon Thames